Polyak is a Hungarian surname that may refer to
Imre Polyák (1932–2010), Hungarian wrestler 
Kornelia Polyak, professor of medicine at Harvard Medical School and breast cancer scientist
Kristóf Polyák (born 1995), Hungarian football player 
Stephen Polyak (1889–1995), American neuroanatomist and neurologist